The Built Ford Tough Offensive Line of the Year was an award given annually in honor of the National Football League (NFL)'s best offensive line. The award was established after the 2016 season, and first awarded to the Dallas Cowboys at the 6th Annual NFL Honors. The award has not been given since the 2018 season.

Background
In 2009, the NFL announced they would be honoring the league's best offensive line with the Madden Most Valuable Protectors Award. The award was named after John Madden and sponsored by Prilosec OTC. The award was discontinued after the 2012 season.

In 2016, the Ford F-Series was named the NFL's official truck sponsor. After that, the NFL and Ford partnered together to begin awarding Offensive Line of the Week recognitions, with NFL Network analyst and former Pro Bowl center Shaun O'Hara selecting those lines. At the 6th Annual NFL Honors, following the 2016 season, the Dallas Cowboys' offensive line was selected as the Offensive Line of the Year.

List

References

National Football League trophies and awards
Ford F-Series